West Bath is a town in Sagadahoc County, Maine, United States.  The population was 1,910 at the 2020 census. A sub-locality of West Bath is Winnegance. West Bath is part of the Portland–South Portland–Biddeford, Maine metropolitan statistical area.

History
Winnegance Carrying Place, located between Winnegance Creek on the Kennebec River and Winnegance Bay on the New Meadow River, was a busy canoe portage for the Kennebec Abenaki Indians. The area was first a portion of Georgetown, incorporated in 1716, then of Bath, incorporated in 1781. West Bath was set off and incorporated as a town on February 14, 1844. When the population was 603 in 1858, industries included a gristmill, sawmill and clapboard, shingle and lath machines. West Bath is today a suburb of Bath and Brunswick.

Geography
Situated on part of a peninsula, West Bath is drained by Winnegance Creek and the New Meadows River estuary.

The town is crossed by U. S. Route 1. It borders the city of Bath to the northeast, town of Phippsburg to the southeast, and (separated by the New Meadows River) is near the towns of Harpswell to the southwest, and Brunswick to the northwest.

Demographics

2010 census
As of the census of 2010, there were 1,877 people, 817 households, and 570 families residing in the town. The racial makeup of the town was 97.2% White, 0.5% African American, 0.7% Native American, 0.5% Asian, 0.1% Pacific Islander, 0.2% from other races, and 0.8% from two or more races. Hispanic or Latino of any race were 0.8% of the population.

There were 817 households, of which 25.3% had children under the age of 18 living with them, 55.2% were married couples living together, 10.4% had a female householder with no husband present, 4.2% had a male householder with no wife present, and 30.2% were non-families. 24.5% of all households were made up of individuals, and 8.5% had someone living alone who was 65 years of age or older. The average household size was 2.29 and the average family size was 2.69.

The median age in the town was 47.7 years. 19.1% of residents were under the age of 18; 6.1% were between the ages of 18 and 24; 20.1% were from 25 to 44; 36.8% were from 45 to 64; and 17.9% were 65 years of age or older. The gender makeup of the town was 47.9% male and 52.1% female.

2000 census
As of the census of 2000, there were 1,798 people, 750 households, and 536 families residing in the town. The racial makeup of the town was 98.22% White, 0.33% African American, 0.39% Native American, 0.33% Asian, 0.22% from other races, and 0.50% from two or more races. Hispanic or Latino of any race were 0.44% of the population.

There were 750 households, out of which 28.5% had children under the age of 18 living with them, 60.3% were married couples living together, 7.7% had a female householder with no husband present, and 28.4% were non-families. 23.2% of all households were made up of individuals, and 6.8% had someone living alone who was 65 years of age or older.  The average household size was 2.39 and the average family size was 2.80.

In the town, the population was spread out, with 22.5% under the age of 18, 5.3% from 18 to 24, 27.7% from 25 to 44, 32.2% from 45 to 64, and 12.2% who were 65 years of age or older.  The median age was 42 years. For every 100 females, there were 99.6 males.  For every 100 females age 18 and over, there were 101.3 males.

The median income for a household in the town was $45,326, and the median income for a family was $52,986. Males had a median income of $34,375 versus $27,448 for females. The per capita income for the town was $23,022.  About 4.0% of families and 6.6% of the population were below the poverty line, including 9.0% of those under age 18 and 4.4% of those age 65 or over.

Education
West Bath is home to one elementary school, West Bath Elementary School.

Site of interest

 Hamilton Sanctuary – Maine Audubon Society

References

External links
 Town of West Bath, Maine
 Patten Free Library
 Lower Kennebec Regional Land Trust
 New Meadows River Watershed Project
 Maine.gov – West Bath, Maine
 Maine Genealogy: West Bath, Sagadahoc County, Maine

Portland metropolitan area, Maine
Towns in Sagadahoc County, Maine
 
Towns in Maine